SS Arcturus was a passenger ship of the Finland Steamship Company operating primarily on the route between Hanko, Finland and Hull, England via Copenhagen, Denmark. Gourlay Brothers of Dundee, Scotland built Arcturus, launching her on 1 October 1898 and completing her that December.

In its earlier years Arcturus was one of the primary ships that Finnish emigrants sailed on when heading to North America. After disembarking at Hull, emigrants would typically take a train to Liverpool to board a transatlantic liner.

On 12 December 1930 in fog in the Kattegat Arcturus collided with another Finnish Steamship Company ship, Oberon. Oberon sank in only three minutes, with the loss of 41 of her passengers and crew.

Arcturus remained in service until 1956.

References

External links
Finland Steamship Company's Emigrant Ships: S/S Arcturus, history from The Genealogical Society of Finland
Finland Steamship Company's Emigrant Ships: S/S Arcturus, pictures from The Genealogical Society of Finland
The Emigrant Route: Hangö-Copenhagen-Hull, from The Swedish-Finn Historical Society

Passenger ships of Finland
Steamships of Finland
Ships built in Dundee